Maan Apmaan is a 1979 Bollywood film directed by N.V. Deshpande.

Plot

Parvati lives in a palatial house with her wealthy father, mother - Laxmi, brother - Pratap, and sister - Kamini. She has a sister, Savitri, who is married to a very wealthy man.

Parvati meets a poor homeless man, Shankar, and they fall in love and marry. Parvati's father does not approve of her marrying someone destitute, and wants her to change her mind, but Parvati refuses to do so. Her father then offers Shankar 10 lakh rupees so they can live a comfortable life, but Shankar refuses to accept this nor do they want to live with Parvati's family.

The couple then leave and go live with Ramdas, a friend of Shankar, but his wife does not appreciate two additional mouths to feed, therefore, Shankar and Parvati re-locate to Shankar's village where they intend to start their life by re-building Shankar's ruin of a house. They do re-build the house, settle down, and soon have a baby boy to add to their family. Her father and mother attend to take a look at the child, but end up humiliating Shankar.

Years roll by, and Parvati never sees her family nor do they come to visit her. Then one day they receive an invitation to attend Kamini's marriage, and they travel all the way there. Once there, they are received warmly by Laxmi, but things take an unexpected turn when Savitri, her husband, Parvati's brother and father refuse to have to do anything with them, Savitri even accuses Parvati of stealing her diamond nose-ring. Humiliated, the three leave and swear never to return.

Then years later, they receive another invitation to attend Pratap's marriage. But will Shankar, Parvati and their son accept this invitation and attend another ceremony where they may face more humiliation?

Cast
Mohan Choti as Makhan 
Gajanan Jagirdar as Parvati's father 
Kanan Kaushal as Parvati (Paro) 
Sanjeev Kumar as Shankar 
Vishwa Mehra   
Ratnamala as Laxmi (Paro's mother) 
Asit Sen as Ramdas (Dasu) 
Shammi as Mrs. Ramdas 
Usha Solanki as Savitri
Dhumal as Makhan's maternal uncle
JayShree T as Courtesan

Music
Lyrics: Bharat Vyas

"Ye Geet Kaun Mere Man Madhuban MeGaa Raha" - Mohammed Rafi, Anuradha Paudwal
"Aa Ja Ri Aa Aa Nindiya Nanhi Si Aankho Me Aa" - Lata Mangeshkar
"Apni Garaj Bairi Piche Piche Aaye" - Asha Bhosle

References

External links
 

1979 films
1970s Hindi-language films
Films scored by Laxmikant–Pyarelal